Navrozov may refer to:

 Andrei Navrozov (born 1956), Russian poet
 Lev Navrozov (1928–2017), Russian author, historian, polemicist

Russian-language surnames